is a Christian-affiliated private junior college in Sagamihara, Kanagawa, Japan.

Founded as a school for kindergarten teachers in 1960, it was located in Setagaya, Tokyo. It changed its name to Izumi Junior College in 1965. In 1974, it relocated to its present location in Sagamihara. Formerly a women's junior college, in 2001, it became coeducational.

External links
 Official website 

 

Educational institutions established in 1946
Private universities and colleges in Japan
Japanese junior colleges
Universities and colleges in Kanagawa Prefecture
1946 establishments in Japan
Western Metropolitan Area University Association